Wendy Corsi Staub (born October 29, 1964) is an American writer of suspense novels and young adult fiction. She has written under her own name as well as Wendy Brody, Wendy Markham, and Wendy Morgan.

Career 
Staub was born in Dunkirk, New York on October 29, 1964. She enjoyed reading as a child, serving on her student newspaper and yearbooks and publishing poetry in Seventeen. After graduating from State University of New York at Fredonia, Staub joined the publishing industry.

Awards and adaptations 
Staub has won various awards during her career. Summer Lightning won a Romance Writers of America Rita Award in 1994.

Staub won the Romance Writers of America-NYC Golden Apple Award for lifetime achievement in 2007. She has won several Washington Irving Book Awards from the Westchester Library Association, including one for Nightwatcher in 2012.

Her book Live to Tell received a starred review from Publishers Weekly.

Blue Moon was nominated for a Mary Higgins Clark award.

Hello, It's Me was adapted into a television movie starring Kellie Martin.

Personal life 
She married Mark J. Staub in 1991. She has two sons, Morgan and Brody.

Works

The Foundlings trilogy 

 Little Girl Lost. William Morrow, 2018. 
 Dead Silence (also published as Little Boy Blue). William Morrow, 2019.

The Mundy’s Landing trilogy 

 Blood Red. William Morrow, 2015. 
Blue Moon. William Morrow, 2015. 
 Bone White. William Morrow, 2017.

The Lily Dale series 

 Nine Lives. Crooked Lane Books, 2015. 
 Something Buried, Something Blue. Crooked Lane Books, 2016. 
 Dead of Winter. Crooked Lane Books, 2017.

Social Media series 

 The Good Sister. Harper, 2013. 
 The Perfect Stranger. Harper, 2014. 
 The Black Widow. Harper, 2015.

Nightwatcher trilogy 

 Nightwatcher. Harper, 2012. 
 Sleepwalker. Harper, 2012. 
 Shadowkiller. Harper, 2013.

Live to Tell trilogy 

 Live to Tell. Avon, 2010. 
 Scared to Death. Avon, 2010. 
 Hell to Pay. Avon, 2011.

Standalones 

 Dying Breath (original title: Dying Light). Zebra, 2008. 
 Dead Before Dark (sequel to Dying Breath). Zebra, 2009. 
 Lullaby and Goodnight. Pinnacle, 2005. 
 Kiss Her Goodbye. Pinnacle, 2004. 
 Most Likely to Die (with Lisa Jackson and Beverly Barton). Zebra, 2007. 
 The Final Victim. Kensington, 2006. 
 She Loves Me Not. Pinnacle, 2003. 
 In the Blink of an Eye. Pinnacle, 2002. 
 The Last To Know. Pinnacle, 2001. 
 All The Way Home. Pinnacle, 2000. 
 Fade to Black. Pinnacle, 2002. 
 Dearly Beloved. Pinnacle, 2003.

Written as Wendy Markham

Standalone books 

 Hello, It’s Me. Forever, 2005. 
 If Only in My Dreams. Signet, 2006. 
 The Best Gift (sequel to If Only in My Dreams). Signet, 2009. 
 Love, Suburban Style. Forever, 2007. 
 Mike, Mike and Me. Red Dress Ink, 2004. 
Thoroughly Modern Princess. Avon, 2003. 
 The Long Way Home. Jove, 1999.

“Slightly” series 

 Slightly Single. Harlequin, 2004. 
 Slightly Settled. Red Dress Ink, 2004. 
 Slightly Engaged. Red Dress Ink, 2004. 
 Slightly Married. Red Dress Ink, 2007. 
 Slightly Suburban. Red Dress Ink, 2008.

Chickalini Family series 

 The Nine Month Plan. Forever, 2003. 
 Once Upon a Blind Date. Warner Books, 2005. 
 Bride Needs Groom. Forever, 2005. 
 That’s Amore. Forever, 2008.

Young adult works

Standalone and short stories 

 Scream and Scream Again (contributor). HarperCollins, 2018. 
 Witch Hunt. Zebra, 1995. 
 Sweet Valley University: Rush Week (Ghostwritten for Francine Pascal). 
 Halloween Party. Zebra, 1994. 
 Summer Lightning. HarperPrism, 1993. 
 Real Life: Help Me. Simon Pulse, 1995. 
 Turning 17: More Than This. HarperCollins, 2000. 
 Turning 17: This Boy Is Mine. HarperCollins, 2001. 
 Charmed: Voodoo Moon. Pocket Books, 1999.

Lily Dale series 

Lily Dale: Awakening. Walker Books for Young Readers, 2007. 
 Lily Dale: Believing. Walker Books for Young Readers, 2008. 
 Lily Dale: Connecting. Walker Books for Young Readers, 2008. 
 Lily Dale: Discovering. Walker Books for Young Readers, 2009.

Teen Angels series 

 Mitzi Malloy and the Anything but Heavenly Summer. Zebra, 1995. 
 Brittany Butterfield and the Back to School Blues. Zebra, 1995. 
 Henry Hopkins and the Horrible Halloween Happening. Zebra, 1995. 
 Candace Caine and the Bah, Humbug Christmas. Zebra, 1995.

The Loop series 

Getting Attached. Silhouette, 1994. 
Getting Hitched. Silhouette, 1995. 
Getting It Together. Silhouette, 1994.

Voodoo series 

Obsession (Written as Wendy Morgan). Pinnacle, 1996. 
Possession (Written as Wendy Morgan). Zebra, 1996.

Other writings 

 Gossip (Movie tie-in/screenplay novelization). Avon Books, 1999. 
 Party of Five: A Family Album (TV Tie-In). Berkley Trade, 1998. 
 Prince Harry (Written as Wendy Brody). Pinnacle, 2000. 
 Never on a Sundae (contributor). Berkley Trade, 2004. 
 Ask Me Again (Written as Wendy Morgan). Zebra, 2000. 
 Loving Max  (Written as Wendy Morgan). Zebra, 1999. 
 Murder on Broadway (with Ed Koch). Kensington, 1996. 
 Murder on 34th Street (with Ed Koch). Kensington, 1997. 
 The Senator Must Die (with Ed Koch). Kensington, 1998. 
 Dangerous (Written with Fabio). Pinnacle, 1996. 
 Wild (Written with Fabio). Pinnacle, 1997. 
 Mysterious (Written with Fabio). Pinnacle, 1998.

References

External links 
 Wendy Corsi Staub official website
 

1964 births
Living people
20th-century American writers
20th-century American women writers
21st-century American writers
21st-century American women writers
People from Dunkirk, New York
State University of New York at Fredonia alumni
Pseudonymous women writers
American young adult novelists
20th-century pseudonymous writers
21st-century pseudonymous writers